Serkan Göcer (born 26 June 1993) is a German footballer who plays for Fortuna Köln in the Regionalliga Südwest.

Career

After playing as a youth for his hometown club, TuS Koblenz, Göcer signed for Rot-Weiß Oberhausen in 2011 and made his 3. Liga debut in the second match of the 2011–12 season, replacing Timo Kunert in a 0–0 draw with 1. FC Saarbrücken. After Oberhausen were relegated at the end of the season, he signed for Saarbrücken. He was released by the club in January 2014 and signed for SV Elversberg. Less than a week after signing for Elversberg, he scored on his debut, a 3–1 win over the club he had just left.

Career statistics

Club

References

External links
 

Serkan Göcer at Kicker

1993 births
Living people
German people of Turkish descent
Rot-Weiß Oberhausen players
1. FC Saarbrücken players
SV Elversberg players
Kickers Offenbach players
FC Schalke 04 II players
FC 08 Homburg players
SC Fortuna Köln players
3. Liga players
Regionalliga players
Association football midfielders
German footballers